Mikko Manninen (born 25 May 1985) is a Finnish footballer who plays as a midfielder for Kakkonen club JJK.

Manninen played well in pre-season for TPS but since the Veikkausliiga started, he's been struggling to find his old form, although he has been able to hold on his starting place for now. On 17 November JJK announced that Manninen would "return home" for the 2011 season as he signed a three-year contract with his old club.

Honours

Individual
Veikkausliiga player of the month: July 2008
Top Assist Player Veikkausliiga 2006 with 9 Assists.
Top Assist Player Veikkausliiga 2008 with 11 Assists.

References

External links
 Guardian's Stats Centre

1985 births
Living people
Finnish footballers
Finland B international footballers
JJK Jyväskylä players
FC Haka players
Veikkausliiga players
Association football wingers
Finland youth international footballers
Finland under-21 international footballers